Lighthouse Hill is a 2004 British comedy film directed by David Fairman and starring Jason Flemyng, Kirsty Mitchell and Frank Finlay.

Cast
 Jason Flemyng - Charlie Davidson 
 Kirsty Mitchell - Grace Angelini
 Frank Finlay - Alfred 
 Kulvinder Ghir - Raymonburr 
 John Sessions - Mr Reynard 
 Katie Sheridan - Young Grace
 Julie T. Wallace - Bunny 
 Annabelle Apsion - Honey 
 Maureen Lipman - Audrey Davidson 
 Samantha Janus - Jennifer
 Samantha Beckinsale - Sally 
 Mark Benton - Peter 
 David Bowles - Mac
 Ashley Artus - Julian the Hippy

References

External links

2004 films
2004 comedy films
British comedy films
Films scored by Christopher Gunning
2000s English-language films
2000s British films